"Candidatus Burkholderia schumannianae" is a bacterium from the genus Caballeronia and the family Burkholderiaceae. "Candidatus Caballeronia schumannianae" is an endosymbiont.

References

Burkholderiaceae
Bacteria described in 2012
Candidatus taxa